Directional light may refer to:

 Shading#Light sources
 Headlamp#Directional headlamps
 Light beam
 Light tube

See also
 Direction (disambiguation)
 Light (disambiguation)